Joyce Tuinukunuku Naceva (born 11 February 1995) is a Fijian footballer who plays as a midfielder for Rewa FC and the Fiji women's national team.

Notes

References

1995 births
Living people
Women's association football midfielders
Fijian women's footballers
Fiji women's international footballers